Eddie Paul Jackson Jr. (born December 19, 1980) is an American chef and former football cornerback. He was signed by the Carolina Panthers as an undrafted free agent in 2004. He played college football for Arkansas. He is a member of the Phi Beta Sigma fraternity.

Jackson was also a member of the Miami Dolphins, New England Patriots and Washington Redskins.

College career
In college, Jackson started 21 of 47 games at both the cornerback and strong safety slots for the Arkansas Razorbacks and totaled 174 tackles, 35 passes defensed, one forced fumble, and two fumble recoveries. He also ran the high hurdles for the national champion Razorback track team. Jackson was also a College All-American in Track and Field where he won four national titles. He still holds the freshman record for the 110 high hurdles.

Professional career

Carolina Panthers
Jackson was signed as an undrafted free agent by the Carolina Panthers in 2004.

Miami Dolphins
He spent the 2005 and 2006 seasons with the Miami Dolphins, and ended his last year on injured reserve with a torn anterior cruciate ligament suffered in a December 25 contest.

Due in part to his injury, Jackson was not tendered a contract by the Dolphins as a restricted free agent.

New England Patriots
On March 19, 2007, Jackson signed a two-year deal with the New England Patriots. The contract contained no signing bonus, and base salaries of $1,510,000 in 2007 and $1,605,000 in 2008. He was released by the Patriots during the 2007 season.

Washington Redskins
Jackson was signed by the Washington Redskins during the 2008 offseason, but was released on June 5.

MasterChef and Food Network
After retiring from football, Jackson became a personal trainer, as well as owning a food truck, Caribbean Grill, in Houston. Cooking had been a lifelong passion of his.

Jackson competed on Season 4 of the reality cooking competition show MasterChef in 2013, finishing in 7th place.

Jackson then competed on Season 11 of the Food Network series Food Network Star in 2015, and won the season, beating out eleven other contestants.

As a reward for winning Food Network Star, Jackson got his own Food Network cooking competition series, BBQ Blitz, in which contestants competed to create the best barbecue dish; Jackson served as the host. The show ran for six episodes in late 2015. Since 2016 he has hosted the Food Network cooking competition series Kids BBQ Championship. For the first season in 2016 his co-host was model Camila Alves, while for the 2nd season in 2017 his co-host was fellow Food Network Star winner (season 9) Damaris Phillips. He also infrequently served as a judge on Clash of the Grandmas. Jackson is the current host of Christmas Cookie Challenge on the Food Network, as well as one of the judges. Jackson has also appeared on Chopped as a judge. In 2021, he was a team captain of BBQ Brawl competing against Bobby Flay and Michael Symon. Jackson also served as a judge on seasons 11 & 12 of Halloween Wars in October 2021 & 2022.

He is currently the host of Outchef’d on the Food Network as well as the host of Christmas Cookie Challenge (2022) with co-host Ree Drummond Food Network.

References

External links
New England Patriots bio
 
 Eddie Jackson Stats

1980 births
Living people
African-American chefs
Chefs from Texas
American male chefs
American chefs
African-American male track and field athletes
African-American players of American football
African-American television hosts
American football cornerbacks
American male hurdlers
Arkansas Razorbacks football players
Arkansas Razorbacks men's track and field athletes
Carolina Panthers players
Food Network Star winners
Miami Dolphins players
New England Patriots players
People from Americus, Georgia
People from Richardson, Texas
Players of American football from Georgia (U.S. state)
Players of American football from Texas
Washington Redskins players
Track and field athletes in the National Football League
Food Network chefs
21st-century African-American sportspeople
20th-century African-American people